Osredke is a dispersed settlement north of Dolsko in the Municipality of Dol pri Ljubljani in the Upper Carniola region of Slovenia.

References

External links

Osredke on Geopedia

Populated places in the Municipality of Dol pri Ljubljani